Motza, also Mozah or Motsa, is a neighbourhood on the western edge of West Jerusalem. It is located in the Judean Hills, 600 metres above sea level, connected to Jerusalem by the Jerusalem–Tel Aviv highway and the winding mountain road to Har Nof. Established in 1854, Motza was the first Jewish farm founded outside the walls of the Old City in the modern era.

History

Antiquity  

Motza is the site of the Canaanite and later Israelite town of Mozah, which according to the Hebrew Bible was allotted by Joshua to the Tribe of Benjamin. The name Mozah was found stamped on pottery handles in Tell en-Nasbeh, a site identified with the biblical city of Mizpah, also in the territory of Benjamin.

In 2012, Israeli archaeologists discovered an Israelite cultic building at Tel Motza, dating to the monarchic period (Iron Age IIA).

Second Temple period 
During the Second Temple period, Motza was the place whence willow branches were cut down for the abundance of willows that grew in the valley, along the riverine brook, and brought to the Temple for ceremonial worship.

It was referred to in the Talmud as a place where people would come to cut young willow branches as a part of the celebration of Sukkot (Mishnah, Sukkah 4.5: 178).

Motza was identified as the Emmaus of Luke in 1881 by William F. Birch (1840–1916) of the Palestine Exploration Fund, and again in 1893 by Paulo Savi. Excavations in 2001–2003 headed by Professor Carsten Peter Thiede let him conclude that Khirbet Mizza/Tel Moza was the only credible candidate for the Emmaus of the New Testament.

After the demise of the Jewish polity in Jerusalem following the First Jewish–Roman War, Vespasian settled 800 Roman soldiers in the town, which became a Roman settlement known as Colonia Amosa. Following the Muslim conquest of the Levant, it became known as Qalunya.

Ottoman era 

 

In 1854, farmland was purchased from the nearby Arab village of Qalunya (Colonia) by a Baghdadi Jew, Shaul Yehuda, with the aid of British consul James Finn. A B'nai B'rith official signed a contract with the residents of Motza residents that enabled them to pay for the land  in long-term payments. Four Jewish families settled there. One family established a tile factory which was one of the earliest industries in the region. 

Motza was home to one of Israel's oldest wineries, the Teperberg Winery, then called Efrat, established in 1870.

In 1871, while plowing his fields, one of the residents, Yehoshua Yellin, discovered a large subterranean hall from the Byzantine period that he turned into a travellers' inn which provided overnight shelter for pilgrims on their way to Jerusalem. 

In 1894 Motza became a moshava (village).

When Theodor Herzl visited Palestine in 1898, he passed through Motza, which then had a population of 200. Captivated by the landscape, he planted a cypress tree on the hill. After he died in 1904 at age 44, it became an annual pilgrimage site by Zionist youth, who planted more trees around Herzl's tree. During World War I, Herzl's tree was cut down by the Turks who were levelling forests for firewood and supplies.

British Mandate 

David Remez named the sanatorium opened in the village Arza, or "cedar", in reference to Herzl's tree. Arza, established in the 1920s, was the first Jewish "health resort" in the country.

The flourishing orchard of the Broza family is mentioned in the Hope Simpson Report in 1930. The children of Motza attended school in one of the rooms built above the vaulted hall. Their teacher was Moshe David Gaon, later father of singer and actor Yehoram Gaon. Motza was the only Jewish presence in the area. Kfar Uria and Hartuv were further west in the Judean foothills. 

According to a census conducted in 1931 by the British Mandate authorities, Motza had a population of 151 inhabitants, in 20 houses.

In 1933 the villagers founded the neighbouring Upper Motza (Motza Illit). 

In December 1948, United Nations General Assembly Resolution 194 recommended that "the built-up area of Motsa" be included in the Jerusalem "Corpus separatum", which was to be detached from "the rest of Palestine" and "placed under effective United Nations control". However, like other provisions of Resolution 194, this was never carried out in practice, and Motza became part of the State of Israel.

1929 murders

Despite good relations with neighbouring Arab communities, the village was attacked during the 1929 Palestine riots. Several residents of Qalunya attacked an outlying house belonging to the Makleff family, killing the father, mother, son, two daughters, and their two guests. Three children survived by escaping out a second-story window; one, Mordechai Maklef, later became Chief of Staff of the Israeli Army. The attackers included the lone police officer and armed man in the area, as well as a shepherd employed by the Makleff family. The village was subsequently abandoned by Jews for a year's time.

Refugees from Motza sent a  letter to the Refugees Aid Committee in Jerusalem describing their plight and asking for help: "Our houses were burned and robbed...we have nothing left. And now we are naked and without food. We need your immediate assistance and ask for nothing more than bread to eat and clothes to wear."

State of Israel
In 2006, the Yellin and Yehuda families helped restore Joshua Yellin's original home, among the oldest and most derelict buildings at the site.

From a municipal perspective, Motza, now called Ramat Motza, is affiliated with the  Jerusalem Municipality. The nearby Motza Illit is under the jurisdiction of the Mateh Yehuda Regional Council.

See also
En Esur, Chalcolithic fortified proto-city in the Sharon Plain

References

 "Talking Picture Magazine", March 1933, p. 45, an article on the film: The Motza Colony, a drama after the event of the murder of the Makleff Family.

External links
 Motza history on Haim Zippori centre for community education 
 Motza Valley 

Populated places established in 1859
Neighbourhoods of Jerusalem
Jewish villages in the Ottoman Empire
Jews and Judaism in Ottoman Palestine
1859 establishments in Ottoman Syria
Crusader castles
1929 Palestine riots